Aleksandra Popović (born 3 May 1999) is a Montenegrin footballer who plays as a defender for Albanian club KFF Vllaznia Shkodër and the Montenegro women's national team.

Career
Popović has been capped for the Montenegro national team, appearing for the team during the 2019 FIFA Women's World Cup qualifying cycle.

International goals

References

External links
 
 
 

1999 births
Living people
Montenegrin women's footballers
Women's association football defenders
Montenegro women's international footballers
Montenegrin expatriate footballers
Montenegrin expatriate sportspeople in Albania
Expatriate footballers in Albania
KFF Vllaznia Shkodër players